Alex Vermeulen also recognised as SOH Alex Vermeulen, is a Dutch artist known for his multimedia projects, films and film books.

Biography
Alex Vermeulen is a contemporary Dutch multi-media artist who has worked under his own name as well as SOH-States of Humanity and Syndicaat Alex Vermeulen. Since 2015 he exclusively works under the name SOH Alex Vermeulen.

His work includes film-books, films, performances, sculpture and installations. A longtime resident of Amsterdam, in the last years Vermeulen has divided his time between Amsterdam, the island of Bali and Brooklyn, New York.

Born in the southern city of Eindhoven, the Netherlands, Vermeulen is largely an autodidact, although he did study psychology, philosophy, architecture and design at the Design Academy Eindhoven before launching off on his own career in his mid-twenties. His primary early influences were film makers such as the Nouvelle Vague director Claude Chabrol and he got inspired by the obscure movie ""J'irai comme un cheval fou" (1973)  by Fernando Arrabal, the absurdist movie Themroc (1973) by Claude Faraldo, the theatrical movie 'Querelle" (1982) by Rainer Werner Fassbinder and the cinematographic fantasy world of Georges Méliès (1862–1938). Vermeulen’s fascination with films would inspire him to put a new spin on an old form – film books. Usually produced to document an existing film, Vermeulen’s versions documented imaginary films in such a way that readers often assumed they were. His visual scripts thus played with the space between reality and imagination a theme seen throughout his work. This film book projects consisting a publication containing the film story with film-stills; on these stills Vermeulen's sculptures function as props.

Vermeulen would first achieve recognition in 1984, when the curators Van Abbemuseum, South Netherlands' began a long period of collaboration with the artist that would last for more than a decade. This would lead to exhibitions and purchases for their permanent collection.

In 1993 Vermeulen moved to Amsterdam and founded in 1995 "SOH-States of Humanity" and the Syndicaat foundation. A year later he presented his final film-book, as part of a large installation, Fuga Futuri, at Amsterdam's Stedelijk Museum (1996). The chief character introduced in this show for the first time was the stylized humanoid "Eggy", named after his egg-like shape. In the following fifteen years, sculptures of various forms of the enigmatic Eggy would appear in a number of projects mounted in public places around the world including New York (1996) where Vermeulen asked those who passed to select their favorite Eggy and relate it to their personal life. These interviews were edited into a 43-minute documentary film, States of Humanity. Vermeulen used a small hi8 video camera to shoot the interviews and visuals of street life NYC. Vermeulen edited the footage. "These talking heads speak for them self." Since the film "States of Humanity" introduced the first six "Eggy" sculptures seen through the eyes of fifty-five New Yorkers, this documentary would become a key work in Vermeulen's career. The premier was at the International Film Festival Rotterdam in 1997.

In the following years SOH and Syndicaat Alex Vermeulen produced more than 29 multi-media events including SOH3, the Mental Urban Labyrinth, with curator Jan Debbaut, at the Van Abbemuseum and SOH1, the Architectural Film at MuHKA, the Museum for Contemporary Art in Antwerp, Belgium, both in 1999. In April 2000 he edited the artist edition trailer of American Psycho presented at the premiere in New York.

With these two exhibitions, the book States of Humanity (1999) was released. The States of Humanity book is to be a travel guide for a present-day metropolis: a manual full of cross-references, coincidences, allusions, stories, pictures, associations.
The structure of the publication should give 'the visitor' a feeling that the different components refer to the planological structure of an imaginary world - a conglomerate of alleyways, streets, boulevards and squares, each with its own character and social traffic.
Vermeulen has invited the following writers to act as 'architects' for the planology of the book: filmmaker Lodge Kerrigan, the philosophers Arthur Danto and Richard Shusterman, composer David Shea, architect Greg Lynn, the writing team Martin and Annette Meyers, director of interdisciplinary dance theater Ron Bunzl and the author Robert Greene (American author), author of books on strategy.

Beginning in 2000 Vermeulen directed a series of films including. For the Nederlandse Programma Stichting he directed the short dance movie One Ride Pony (2000). for the European Union sponsored Democracy Conference SOH13 the Power of Collective Intelligence and Awareness (2004). For the Holland Festival, Amsterdam (NL) he directed cinematographic opera: SOH10 the Opera (2003-2008) trailer in collaboration with composer David Shea

In 2006 Alex Vermeulen mounted a large installation with 88 enormous black polyester eggs topped with solar panels floating in a pond at Eindhoven's University of Technology (NL). Dubbed "SOH19 States of Nature," the project combines physics, art, technology, spirituality, solar cult, and sustainable energy. Created in association with the Natuurkunst Foundation and some Applied Physics university students, the aim of this self-sustained installation is to lift a levitating Buddha sculpture using the sun's energy!

Part of the project was the release of the international catalogue : SOH19 States of Nature; Sun enlightenment Which tells the story of the evolution of the project and its participants, focussing on topics like physics and art, technology and spirituality, solar cult and sustainable energy, biological processes and social interaction.
Essays from (a.o.) Marcel Möring (‘the Great Longing’), Vincent Icke (astrophysicist), Robert Greene (‘The 48 Laws of Power’), IJsbrand van Veelen (VPRO), Koert van Mensvoort (TU/e) en Jan van Adrichem (Stedelijk Museum Amsterdam).
Alex Vermeulen & Frans Snik (ed.), SOH19 States of Nature; Sun enlightenment, Pijama Publishers, 144 p., release September 12, 2006

In 2012 Vermeulen has stopped producing Eggy sculptures. All Eggies so far did not have any arms. However the last Eggy has arms; which could either express a "Hurray" or form together with the legs a X shape, a symbol that could be seen as a reference to the unknown. At the same time Vermeulen closed his studio in Amsterdam. In 2014 he set up new studios in both Bali and New York City.

In 2003, Vermeulen began working on a new interactive cinematographic WebBook, The Epic. Directed and produced by Vermeulen, The Epic is a multifaceted collaborative project loosely based on the Ramayana Epic written by Valmiki and the tragedy Othello by William Shakespeare and takes place in a sprawling Asian metropolis named Raksasa Kota (City of the Future) in the year 2088. The stars of the production are a group of young Balinese dancers between the ages of six and ten. Rien Bekkers designed the sumptuous costumes. The music is composed by David Shea. The large interactive installation will consist of a series of monumental photos, a suggested feature written and directed by Vermeulen shot in collaboration, among others, with photographer Doddy Obenk.

As part of the production, Dutch filmmaker Peter Mariouw Smit, has been directed a documentary, The Epic: Behind the Scenes.

During the period 2003-2019 Vermeulen conducted, in collaboration with University of Technology, Eindhoven, the Netherlands a study into the effect of frequencies on human emotions. He processed the results in the three-part project SOH17 the Mood Rooms (2006-2009). and SOH30 The Sonic Service Station (2019)

Gallery

Solo exhibitions and projects
(selection)

1984
- "Het Avontuur der Verwondering" Van Abbemuseum, Eindhoven (NL) (catalogue)

1986
- "No one but Onno Trueman" Van Abbemuseum, Eindhoven (NL) (catalogue)

1996
- "Fuga Futuri", Stedelijk museum, Amsterdam (NL) (catalogue)

1999
- SOH1 (States of Humanity)  Museum of Contemporary Art, Antwerpen (B) (catalogue)

1999
- SOH3 The Mental Urban Labyrinth, Van Abbemuseum, Eindhoven (NL) (catalogue)

2000
- SOH7 The Urban Fashion Crank Lab, Cerruty New York City (USA)

2000
- Artist edition of the trailer of the feature film "American Psycho" a film by Mary Haron showed at the premiere, New York City (USA)

2005
- SOH16 Tour des Sens, deWatertoren AK, Vlissingen (NL)

2003
- SOH10 the Opera, Holland Festival (NL)

2006
- SOH19 States of Nature, Performance featuring Eddy De Clercq and Erik Hobijn Technical University Eindhoven TU/e (NL)

2007
- SOH23 You know why I am so happy?! Gallerie Annette de Keyser, Antwerpen (B)

2017
- SOH19 States of Nature, performance with the Tesla Coil, featuring Eddy de Clercq, Technical University Eindhoven TU/e (NL)

2018
- SOH29 the Epic, TONYRAKA gallery, Mas, Ubud Bali, premiere October 9, 2018

2018
- SOH29 the Epic, performance of the actors in the original costumes, October 27 at TONYRAKA gallery, Mas, Ubud Bali

2018
- SOH29 the Epic, Jakarta, Kerta Niaga Gallery, Jakarta

2019
- SOH29 the Epic, het Erasmus Huis, Jakarta

Films
(selection)

1994
-  "Ballroom da Capo", 16mm zw/w & colour 12" dansfilm in collaboration with choreographer Cecile Vandeursen

1996
- "States of Humanity" documentary, Betacam 45", première: 28th International Film Festival Rotterdam

1997
- "Cewek" video 3" DVcam 6" dance film in collaboration with choreographer Cecile Vandeursen

1999 - Dishhunt in collaboration with Joop van Brakel video clip MTV Betacam SP 4"

1999 - SOH2 the Urban Hyper Video & Sound Experience in collaboration with David Shea, Montevideo TBA, Amsterdam (NL)

1999 - SOH4 the Urban Crank Lab, De Fabriek, Eindhoven (NL)

1999 - SOH5 the Urban Hyper Video & Sound Experience in collaboration with David Shea, World Wide Video Festival, Amsterdam (NL)

1999 - SOH6 The Mental Urban Labyrinth Book presentation, in collaboration with Arthur Danto, the New Museum of Contemporary Art, NYC (USA)

1999 - SOH7 the Urban Fashion Crank Lab, the Artist edition of the trailer of "American Psycho", in collaboration with Cerruti Madison Avenue, New York/Hollywood (USA)

2000
- "One Ride Poney"  35mm film 12", dansfilm in collaboration with performer Susanne Ohmann and choreographer Cecile Vandeursen, NPS / BBC (NL/UK)

2003
-  SOH10 the Opera in collaboration with composer David Shea, performer Kate Strong and choreographer Cecile Vandeursen; première: Holland Festival 2003 (NL/FR)

2003 - SOH10 promo (documentary by Claire van de Poel)

2004
- SOH13 The Power of Collective Intelligence and Awareness DVD / live performed at het Vredes Paleis, the Hague (NL) performed before the European Union (B)

2006
- SOH22 We all do it, den Bosch (NL)

2006
- SOH19 States of Nature TU/e collaboration project studenten Natuurkunde (documentary by Bart van Broekhoven)

2018 
- The Epic behind the scenes (documentary by Peter Mariouw Smit). Premiere: September 27, Balinale, The International Film Festival Bali 2018

Bibliography
 1985: Het avond-uur der verwondering, 
 1986: En passant Baltimore Krüger, 
 1988: Alleen Onno Trueman (Engelse editie: No one but Onno Trueman), 
 1992: Terra refrigera, 
 1996: Fuga Futuri, 
 1999 SOH (States of Humanity), MuHKA / van Abbemuseum 
 2006 Sun Enlightenment (SOH19 States of Nature) Technical University Eindhoven (TU/e) 
 2018 the Epic (WebBook) Book Launch at the Ubud Writers and Readers Festival October 26, 2018

Public Space
(selection)

1992 - "Well in time", A.V.I. west, Amsterdam (NL)

1992 - "Rebirth of the Rebirth II" Ziekenfondsraad, Amstelveen (NL)

1994 - "Friend's connection", Hoge School voor Toerisme en Verkeer, Breda (NL)

1995 - Multiple not multiple, balance, MBO college, de Leijgraaf, Veghel (NL)

1996 - Me oh my, Ahold, Zaandam

1996 - SOH ps1 (States of Humanity) Zonder titel, water pump station De Haere, WMG Gelderland (NL)

1997 - "The most profitable Technical Innovation Award" Akzo Nobel Coatings Akzo Nobel, Arnhem

1999 -  SOH ps2  (States of Humanity), Oirschot at A58 (NL)

1999 -  SOH ps3  (States of Humanity), Woonaard, Alkmaar (NL)

1999 -  SOH ps4  (States of Humanity), Hoogland, community Amersfoort (NL)

2000 -  SOH ps5  (States of Humanity), Dongen, GGV Midden Brabant, Tilburg (NL)

2001 -  SOH ps6  (States of Humanity), Hessenpoort,  Zwolle (NL)

2001 -  SOH ps7  (States of Humanity), sculpture design Wildehoarne, Joure (NL)

2001 -  SOH ps8  (States of Humanity), sculpture design, Diemen (NL)2001

2002 -  SOH ps6   (States of Humanity),  Hessenpoort, Gemeente Zwolle (NL)

2002 -  SOH ps10 (States of Humanity), Land Mark Verrijn Stuart Diemen (NL)

2002 -  SOH ps11 (States of Humanity), concept development SITE, a new museum for Almere (NL)

2002 -  SOH ps12 (States of Humanity), design Rijswijk (NL)

2002 -  SOH19 States of Nature, development project, Technical University Eindhoven TU/e (NL)

2003 -  SOH ps13 (States of Humanity), schetsontwerp Adriaan Stoopplein, Bloemendaal (NL)

2003 -  SOH ps14 (States of Humanity), Stadhuis Rijswijk (NL)

2003 -  SOH ps15 (States of Humanity), sculpture design rotonde Daalmeer, Alkmaar (NL)

2003 -  SOH19 States of Nature, development project, Technical University Eindhoven TU/e, (NL)

2004 -  SOH ps16 (States of Humanity), "The Coatings Innovation Award", Akzo Nobel, Arnhem (NL/GB)

2004 -  SOH19 States of Nature, development project, Technical University Eindhoven TU/e (NL)

2006  -  SOH19 States of Nature, Technical University Eindhoven TU/e (NL)

2007 -  SOH ps 20(States of Humanity) Landgoed Driessen (NL)

2008 -  SOH ps17 Raalte / Heeten (NL)

2009 -  SOH ps18 MN services, Rijswijk (NL)

2009 -  SOH ps19 Terneuzen (NL)

2019 -  SOH19 States of Nature part II, Technical University Eindhoven TU/e (NL)

References

External links

 (official website)
 (official website)

1954 births
Living people
Dutch artists
Dutch film directors
Dutch publishers (people)
People from Eindhoven